Eremias scripta (commonly known as the sand racerunner) is a species of lizard found in Kazakhstan, Turkmenistan, Iran, Afghanistan, Pakistan, Uzbekistan, Tajikistan, and  Kyrgyzstan.

References

Eremias
Reptiles described in 1867
Taxa named by Alexander Strauch